Paul Ritter (4 March 1829 – 27 November 1907) was a German architectural painter and etcher.

Biography
He was born at Nuremberg. He was deaf and dumb from the fourth year of his life. A pupil of Heideloff, he engraved for publishers in Berlin, Stuttgart, and Nuremberg. About 1870 he took up painting in oil. In 1888 the title of royal professor was conferred on him. He died in Nuremberg.

Works
Ritter acquired considerable reputation with his interiors and street views of Nuremberg, richly supplemented with historical figures, such as:
 “Interior of Church of St. Lawrence” (1874)
 “Schöne Brunnen” (1880)
 “Entry of Procession with the Crown Jewels into Nuremberg in 1424” (1883, City Hall, Nuremberg)
 “Entry of Gustavus Adolphus in 1632” (1886)
 “Emperor Matthias Leaving the Kaiserburg in 1612” (1890)
 “Monument of Saint Sebaldus”

Family
His younger brother, Lorenz Ritter, was also an artist.

Notes

References
 

1829 births
1907 deaths
19th-century German painters
19th-century German male artists
German male painters
20th-century German painters
20th-century German male artists
German engravers
German etchers
Academic staff of the Academy of Fine Arts, Nuremberg
20th-century German printmakers
20th-century engravers